Ventricular flutter is an arrhythmia, more specifically a tachycardia affecting the ventricles with a rate over 250-350 beats/min, and one of the most indiscernible. It is characterized on the ECG by a sinusoidal waveform without clear definition of the QRS and T waves. It has been considered as a possible transition stage between ventricular tachycardia and fibrillation, and is a critically unstable arrhythmia that can result in sudden cardiac death.

It can occur in infancy, youth, or as an adult.

It can be induced by programmed electrical stimulation.

References

External links 

 http://www.medscape.com/viewarticle/409172_3

Cardiac arrhythmia